Kay Arne Stenshjemmet (born 9 August 1953) is a former speed skater from Norway.

Short biography
Together with Amund Sjøbrend, Sten Stensen, and Jan Egil Storholt, Kay Stenshjemmet was one of the legendary four S-es (which sounds like "four aces" in Norwegian), four Norwegian top skaters in the 1970s and early 1980s. Kay is now working for Romerikes Blad

During the 1976 European Allround Championships in Oslo, fellow Norwegian Sten Stensen (the defending European Champion), set a new world record on the 10,000 m, but Stenshjemmet still became European Champion by a tiny margin of only 0.005 points (equivalent to 0.10 seconds on the 10000 m).

At the end of the 1975–1976 season, the world record on the 5000 m was Piet Kleine's 7:02.38. On 19 March 1977, first Sergey Marchuk and then in the following pair Stenshjemmet were the first to skate the 5000 m below seven minutes, with 6:58.88 and 6:56.9, respectively. Stenshjemmet's world record would last for five years, until Aleksandr Baranov skated 6:54.44.

Stenshjemmet was European Allround Champion in 1976 and 1980. He was also Norwegian Allround Champion in 1976, 1977, 1978, and 1981, as well as Norwegian Sprint Champion in 1976. At the 1980 Winter Olympics in Lake Placid, Stenshjemmet won silver on the 1500 m and on the 5000 m, both behind Eric Heiden.

Medals
An overview of medals won by Stenshjemmet at important championships he participated in, listing the years in which he won each:

World record
During his career, Stenshjemmet skated one world record:

Source: SpeedSkatingStats.com

Personal records
To put these personal records in perspective, the WR column lists the official world records on the dates that Stenshjemmet skated his personal records.

Note that Stenshjemmet's personal record on the big combination was not a world record because Jan Egil Storholt skated 163.221 at the same tournament.

Stenshjemmet has an Adelskalender score of 163.481 points. His highest ranking on the Adelskalender was a third place.

References

External links
 
 Personal records from Jakub Majerski's Speedskating Database
 Evert Stenlund's Adelskalender pages
 Historical World Records from the International Skating Union
 National Championships results from Norges Skøyteforbund (the Norwegian Skating Association)

1953 births
Living people
World record setters in speed skating
Norwegian male speed skaters
Olympic speed skaters of Norway
Olympic silver medalists for Norway
Speed skaters at the 1976 Winter Olympics
Speed skaters at the 1980 Winter Olympics
People from Lillestrøm
Olympic medalists in speed skating
Medalists at the 1980 Winter Olympics
World Allround Speed Skating Championships medalists
Sportspeople from Viken (county)